Vasco Gonçalves (born 22 January 1974) is a Portuguese former professional tennis player.

A left-handed player, Gonçalves played professional tennis in the 1990s, reaching a best singles ranking of 368 in the world. Most notably he featured in the singles qualifying draw for the 1996 Wimbledon Championships and made three ATP Tour main draw appearances in doubles. He was a two-time national champion in doubles.

References

External links
 
 

1974 births
Living people
Portuguese male tennis players
20th-century Portuguese people